Wilson Enrique Rodríguez Amézquita (born 22 February 1994) is a Colombian cyclist who currently rides for EBSA–Indeportes Boyacá.

Major results
2016
 1st Overall Volta a Portugal do Futuro

References

1994 births
Living people
Colombian male cyclists